"Who Can I Run To" is a 1979 song written by Charles B. Simmons, Frank Alstin Jr, Richard Roebuck  and originally recorded by The Jones Girls. The song was the B-side to "You Gonna Make Me Love Somebody Else". Billboard named the song #58 on their list of 100 Greatest Girl Group Songs of All Time.

Xscape version and samples
A 1995 cover version by R&B group, Xscape, spent one week at number one on the U.S. R&B Singles chart and reached number eight on the pop chart.
A remix was also made, which sampled former labelmate Teddy Pendergrass's "Love T.K.O."
R&B artist Anderson Paak sampled the Xscape version for his song "Might Be" from the album Venice in 2014. This song would later be covered by DJ Luke Nasty in 2015, also sampling the Xscape version.

Other versions
In 1996, Ricky Dillard and the New Generation Chorale released the album, Worked It Out. It included a version of "Who Can I Run To?" that answered the question with "I need the Lord."
At the end of 2008, this song was reworked into a house music track with vocals from Dawn Tallman, released on Thick Recordings.
Juvenile sampled the original version of the song in 2007 for a song also called "Who Can I Run To?" featuring Mannie Fresh and Soulja Slim. It was on an album entitled "Diary of a Soulja" that was never released.

Charts

Weekly charts

Year-end charts

Certifications

See also
 R&B number-one hits of 1995 (USA)

References

1995 singles
Xscape (group) songs
Song recordings produced by Jermaine Dupri
1979 songs
Columbia Records singles
Contemporary R&B ballads
Soul ballads
1970s ballads